The Headies Award for Best Performer is an award presented at The Headies, a ceremony that was established in 2006 and originally called the Hip Hop World Awards. It was first presented to Yemi Alade in 2018.

Recipients

Category records
Most wins 

Most nominations

References

The Headies